Polygamous marriages in the Democratic Republic of Congo are officially illegal, the
practice continues. It is still practiced as a part of traditional culture.

References 

Society of the Democratic Republic of the Congo
Congo, Democratic Republic
Women's rights in the Democratic Republic of the Congo